Plomesgate is a hundred of Suffolk, consisting of .

Plomesgate Hundred comprises the historic ports of Aldeburgh and Orford, the medieval market town of Saxmundham and twenty other parishes in the east of the county. It forms a strip around 14 miles long and up to 9 miles wide running south-east from near Framlingham to the North Sea. It is bounded on the east by the sea, on the north by Blything Hundred, on the west by Hoxne and Loes Hundreds and on the south by the Butley River which flows into the River Ore near Orford Ness.

The hundred is watered by the River Alde and its tributary streams and is generally a fertile loamy district with hills rising from the valleys and the coast and with sandy beaches in southern parts. It is in the Deanery of Orford in the Archdeaconry of Suffolk.

Listed as Plumesgata in the Domesday Book, the origin of the name is unknown though presumably a derivation of "Plum's gate".

Parishes

Plomesgate Hundred consists of the following 23 parishes:

† Hamlet of Aldeburgh

References

Hundreds of Suffolk